Fraunceys is a surname. Notable people with the surname include:

 Sewal Fraunceys (fl. 1380–1386), English politician
 Edward Fraunceys ( 1566–1626), English politician

See also
 Francis (disambiguation)